Lynette Pearson (16 April 1950 - 11 December 2001), known professionally as Lynette Lithgow), was a Trinidad-born, British-based newsreader and journalist who is best remembered for her career as a newsreader for BBC News.

Lithgow's first media job was as a broadcaster for Radio Television Brunei during the 1970s. During the 1980s, she moved to Britain. After working as a presenter for Midlands Today and a continuity announcer for Granada Television, Lithgow moved to London as a newsreader for the national BBC News in 1988.

Lithgow joined the BBC's world television service on its launch in 1991 and also presented BBC 2's Newsview. Lithgow was the first BBC newsreader to announce the resignation of Margaret Thatcher around 9:45 AM, interrupting an edition of People Today, on 22 November 1990.

Lithgow quit the BBC in 1996 upon gaining a law degree from Oxford University. She subsequently moved to the business news channel CNBC Asia (based in Singapore), where she worked until her death in Trinidad in December 2001.

Murder

Lithgow was murdered, along with her 83-year-old mother, Maggie Lee, and her British brother-in-law, John Cropper, at the family home in Port of Spain. The family had just enjoyed a tea party when bandits struck. The family was found with their hands bound and their throats cut. A detective who was granted anonymity due to a rule forbidding police from contacting the media during an investigation called the murder scene "the most brutal and grisly" he had ever seen, adding in a statement to the BBC, "I have visited a number of scenes in my career, but I never see anything as brutal or grisly as that."

While earlier reports stated that a "group of bandits" had ambushed the home, only two men were ever arrested and charged for their involvement in the crime: Lester Pittman and Daniel Agard. Both were convicted of murder, and both were immediately sentenced to death in 2004, as murder convictions come with a mandatory death sentence in Trinidad and Tobago. After repeatedly appealing the sentences, both Pittman and Agard had their sentences overturned in March 2010 due to the fact that the law in Trinidad and Tobago prohibited the executions of prisoners who had spent more than five years on death row. In December 2013, both were re-sentenced to a minimum of 40 years in prison.

Personal life
Lynette Lithgow was married twice and had two children from her first marriage. Her second marriage, from 1998 until her death, was to Dominic Pearson.

In 2005, the Harvard Kennedy School established a fund in Lithgow's honor to support students  interested in journalism.

References

1950 births
2001 deaths
Trinidad and Tobago emigrants to the United Kingdom
BBC newsreaders and journalists
Murdered journalists
Trinidad and Tobago murder victims
Violence against women in Trinidad and Tobago